Nycteola cinereana, the grey midget or ash-colored owlet moth, is a nolid moth in the family Nolidae. The species was first described by Berthold Neumoegen and Harrison Gray Dyar Jr. in 1893. It is found in North America.

The MONA or Hodges number for Nycteola cinereana is 8977.

References

Further reading

External links
 

Chloephorinae
Articles created by Qbugbot
Moths described in 1893